Venkatesh Kumar R Kodur is a scientist and university professor, currently at  Michigan State University. He was born in Kodur village in Karnataka India, received his bachelor's degree  in Civil engineering from the University Visveswaraya College of Engineering, Bangalore, India, in 1984. He received his M.Sc. and Ph.D. degrees from Queen's University at Kingston, Canada, in 1988 and 1992, respectively. Following a brief stint as a Post-doctoral Fellow at Royal Military College, Kingston, Canada, he joined the National Research Council (Canada), where as senior scientist, he carried out extensive research in structural fire safety field. In 2005, he joined the faculty of Michigan State University (MSU), where he is currently a University Distinguished Professor in the Department of Civil & Environmental Engineering. Kodur has established unique fire test facilities and highly acclaimed research program in structural fire engineering area at MSU and is the founding director of the Center on Structural Fire Safety and Diagnostics.

Kodur's research has focused on the experimental behavior and analytical modeling of structural systems under extreme fire conditions, Constitutive modelling of material properties at elevated temperatures, Fire resistance design of structural systems, and Building collapse investigations. His contributions to the field of structural fire safety and high performing construction materials are seminal and numerous, and his research accomplishments have had major impacts. He has developed fundamental understanding on the behavior of materials and structural systems under extreme fire conditions. The techniques and methodologies resulting from his research is instrumental for minimizing the destructive impact of fire in the built infrastructure, which continues to cause thousands of deaths and billions of dollars of damage each year in the US and around the world. Many of these design approaches and fire resistance solutions have been incorporated in to various construction codes and design standards in the US and around the world.

Kodur has advised around 25 postdoctoral researchers, 26 PhD students, 25 MS students and number of undergraduate students over the last 20 years. Many of his (former) PhD and postdoctoral students are currently faculty members in reputed universities throughout the world. Dr. Kodur, together with his students and collaborators, has published results from his research in 500+ peer-reviewed papers in journals and conferences, and has given numerous key-note presentations in major international conferences. He is one of the highly cited authors in Civil Engineering and Fire Protection Engineering disciplines, and as per Google Scholar, he has more than 17,600 citations with an "h" index of 74. The most recent contribution from Kodur is a new text book on “Structural Fire Engineering” published by McGraw-Hill Education.

He has been elected as Fellow of six Institutes/Academies: Canadian Academy of Engineering, American Society of Civil Engineers, Indian National Academy of Engineering, Structural Engineering Institute, American Concrete Institute and the Society of Fire Protection Engineers. He is a professional engineer, Associate Editor of Journal of Structural Engineering, and Journal of Structural Fire Engineering, editorial board member of five leading journals, Chairman of ASCE-29 (Fire) Standards Committee, and a member of UK-EPSRC College of Reviewers.

Awards 
 Elected Fellow of American Society of Civil Engineers, ASCE, 2005
 University Distinguished Faculty Award, MSU, 2011
 University Distinguished Professor Award, 2017

References 

Year of birth missing (living people)
Living people
Engineers from Karnataka
People from Chikkamagaluru district
University Visvesvaraya College of Engineering alumni
Indian emigrants to the United States
American people of Kannada descent